Bojack may refer to:
 BoJack Horseman, an American adult animated comedy-drama television series
 BoJack Horseman (character), the protagonist and title character of the above television series
 Dragon Ball Z: Bojack Unbound, a 1993 Japanese animated film
 Paul Bojack, American film director and writer